Liernais is a commune in the Côte-d'Or department in eastern France. It is the geometric centre of the Eurozone.

Population

See also
Communes of the Côte-d'Or department
Mancini family
Parc naturel régional du Morvan

References

Communes of Côte-d'Or